The Walker House in Garrard County, Kentucky is a historic house on Kentucky Route 1295 about  north of Lancaster, Kentucky. It was added to the National Register of Historic Places in 1985.

It is a two-story, 14-room central hall plan Italianate-style house built in 1824.

It was home of the Walker family who developed the "Walker hounds" for fox hunting.  It has also been deemed Garrard County's "best example of a brlck Italianate residence."

References

Further information
 

Houses completed in 1880
Houses on the National Register of Historic Places in Kentucky
Italianate architecture in Kentucky
National Register of Historic Places in Garrard County, Kentucky
Houses in Garrard County, Kentucky
Central-passage houses
1880 establishments in Kentucky